Wild Adventures (known previously as Liberty Farms) is a zoological theme park in Clyattville, Georgia, which is located  south of Valdosta, Georgia, United States. It is owned by Herschend Family Entertainment and has been managed by Jon Vigue since October 2020. The park features rides and attractions, including six roller coasters, exotic animals, shows, Splash Island water park and concerts from country, pop, rock, Christian, and oldies superstars. The park is located just off of Interstate 75.

History
Kent Buescher, the founder of Wild Adventures, started the park with his wife, Dawn, on a plot of farmland outside of Valdosta, Georgia in 1996 for around $10 million. Wild Adventures started out as a small petting zoo known as Liberty Farms D&L. The park is home to six roller coasters and numerous flat rides. The rides were initially added to the park in 1998 and it has since rapidly grown. "Splash Island", the park's water park, opened in 2003 as the park's largest expansion which includes several water slides and attractions.

In 2004, Adventure Parks Group purchased Cypress Gardens in Winter Haven, Florida. The company was privately held by Buescher. Expansion died down for the park following the Cypress Gardens purchase.

In 2005, "Gauntlet" was added, which is an S&S Power Screamin' Swing complex. For the park's 10th anniversary in 2006, the park announced their intent to add the Shaka Zula River Adventure log flume, relocated from the defunct Miracle Strip Amusement Park in Panama City Beach, Florida. The ride was delayed due to engineering problems, and never opened to the public.

In September 2006, Adventure Parks Group filed for Chapter 11 bankruptcy protection. The park operated without interruption during the bankruptcy reorganization.

On September 25, 2007, Wild Adventures was sold because of bankruptcy requirements. Adventure Parks Group LLC, announced that Cypress Gardens Adventure Park in Winter Haven and Wild Adventures park in Valdosta, Georgia, will be sold to the highest bidder in a private auction starting September 25. The sale fulfilled requirements resulting from a Chapter 11 bankruptcy protection filing by Adventure Parks Group a year ago, but did not mean the end of either theme park. The opening minimum bid for a package purchase of the parks is $53.25 million, Sumner said. The opening minimum bid for Cypress Gardens was $17.4 million and the opening minimum bid for Wild Adventures was $38.85 million. In September 2006, Adventure Parks Group filed for bankruptcy protection from creditors seeking payment for $25 million in debts. Much of the company's financial difficulties can be traced to 2004, when three hurricanes (Hurricane Charley, Hurricane Frances and Hurricane Jeanne) ravaged East Polk County, Florida and left a trail of destruction at Cypress Gardens.

On September 25, 2007, The Ledger reported that Herschend Family Entertainment had purchased Wild Adventures for $34.4 million.

Upon Herschend taking over the park, they had "Gauntlet" removed and indicated that they do not plan on opening the "Shaka Zula River Adventure" log flume ride. However, Herchend did open The Rattler, the first new ride in three years, on March 21, 2008. It is a Huss Frisbee type flat-ride manufactured by Moser Rides of Italy. Also, in 2008, the Tiger Terror roller coaster was sold and moved to Lowry Park Zoo in Tampa, Florida and renamed "Tasmanian Tiger".

In February 2009, the American post-apocalyptic zombie comedy Zombieland amusement park scenes were filmed at Wild Adventures.

For the 2010 season, the park added several rides including "Viking Voyage", "Whirling Wildcats", and "Falcon Flyers". All three rides were from the now-defunct Celebration City in Branson, Missouri. Gold Rush and Mystery Maze were removed. "Bug Out" was renamed "Go Bananas". The S&S Doubleshot was renamed "Firecracker".

Two new rides, "Tail Spin" and "Wacky Wheels", were added before the 2013 season; in 2015 "Jungle Rumble", a flat ride, was added.

Before the 2019 season, "Fiesta Express" was moved out of storage and became "Swampwater Snake" in a new children themed area "Discovery Outpost", the S&S Doubleshot was renamed "Blazer Blast off".  After the 2019 season,  "Viking Voyage" moved to Fun Spot Kissimmee.

Beginning in the 2020 season, “Blackfoot Falls” was renovated and renamed “Island Falls", and the "Pharaoh's Fury" was moved to another zone of the park after the closure of surrounding rides.

In early 2021 it was announced that the park's CCI wooden coaster Cheetah would be retired after closure in the 2020 season, as were the park's go-karts and mini-golf course.

For the 2022 season, the "Falcon Flyers" was renamed the "American Flyers" and received a patriotic paint job. "Brews and Bites", a restaurant, started selling alcoholic beverages - also new covered seating and live concert area were added to it.  At the end of the season, the "Yo-Yo" ride had been removed from its current location.

Sections
In 2019 the park built "Discovery Outpost", a new children's section, with all rides in the area being recycled, and many rides being repainted and renovated to match the theme of the area. It is the only themed section of the park, having a swampland theme to reflect the surroundings of the park, as well to complement the nearby Alapaha Trail. Past themes included Base Camp, Bugsville, Australian Outback, Alapaha Preserve, The Lagoon, African Pridelands, and Wild West.

Attractions

Roller coasters

Thrill rides

Family rides

Water rides

Discovery Outpost

Oasis Outpost

Splash Island water park

Splash Island is a Polynesian themed water park and is free with admission into Wild Adventures. It takes up  of the  park with seven rides, and five shops. It is frequently the most crowded area of the park. Splash Island first opened in 2003 being Wild Adventures largest expansion since rides were introduced in 1999.

When Splash Island was opened it had no theming and more closely resembled a community pool center. In 2008, Wild Adventures announced that Splash Island would undergo a $4 million renovation turning the park into a Polynesian themed paradise. Wild Adventures also announced their intent to build a new ride, the Wahee Cyclone.

Rides
Bonzai Pipelines
3 Inter-twined slides featuring the tallest slides in Georgia built in 2004
Catch-a-wave bay
A large  wave pool built in 2003
Hakini Rapids
A 5-Story "Family Sized" water slide with unexpected turns and drops built in 2011
Kalani Blasters
2 Medium sized inter-twined slides built in 2003
Kona Cliffs
A giant, "Family Sized" speed slide with three drops built in 2011
Paradise River
A relaxing "lazy river" through the water park built in 2003
Polynesian Adventure
A 4-story water fortress built in 2003
Wahee Cyclone
A 5-story water tornado built in 2009
Sea Turtle Cove
A small water play area for younger children built in 2006

Former rides

Annual events

 Boy Scouts Day
 Girl Scouts Day
 Great Pumpkin LuniNights and Pumpkin Spice Festival - Halloween themed event with several attractions, Terror in the Wild is currently discontinued and it was replaced by one of these seasonal Fall events such as this one.
 Wild Adventures Christmas - Christmas themed event.

References

External links

 
Amusement parks in Georgia (U.S. state)
Tourist attractions in Lowndes County, Georgia
Buildings and structures in Lowndes County, Georgia
Herschend Family Entertainment
1996 establishments in Georgia (U.S. state)
Amusement parks opened in 1996